The Sundance State Bank, also known as the Bid Building, was built in 1914 on Main Street in Sundance, Wyoming. It is unusual as a stone building in an era where brick construction was more popular. It was built of local sandstone taken from nearby Reuter Canyon.

The Sundance State Bank was founded in 1888 as Stebbins, Fox & Company, becoming the Bank of Sundance, then in 1895 the Sundance State Bank. Surviving banking crises in the 1890s, the bank prospered during the agricultural boom of the first decades of the 1900s. It was able to continue on through the Great Depression.

The Sundance State Bank Building was listed on the National Register of Historic Places in 1984.

References

External links
 Sundance State Bank at the Wyoming State Historic Preservation Office

Bank buildings on the National Register of Historic Places in Wyoming
Commercial buildings completed in 1914
Buildings and structures in Crook County, Wyoming
National Register of Historic Places in Crook County, Wyoming